Shakuntalā Parānjpye (17 January 1906 – 3 May 2000) was an Indian writer, actress and a prominent social worker. She was a member of Maharashtra Legislative Council during 1958–64, and served as nominated member of,  Rajya Sabha (Upper House of Indian Parliament) during 1964–70.
 In 1991, she was awarded, Padma Bhushan,the third-highest civilian award in the Republic of India, in recognition of her pioneering work in the field of family planning.

Biography
Shakuntala Paranjpye was the daughter of Sir R. P. Paranjpye, the first Indian to be Senior Wrangler at the University of Cambridge, an educationist, and India's High Commissioner to Australia during 1944–1947.

Shakuntala studied for the Mathematical Tripos at Newnham College, Cambridge. She graduated there in 1929. She received a Diploma in Education from London University the next year.

Shakuntala worked in the 1930s with the International Labour Organization in Geneva, Switzerland. In the 1930s and 1940s, she also acted in some Marathi and Hindi movies.

Shakuntala wrote many plays, sketches, and novels in Marathi. Some of her work was in English.

A Hindi children's movie, Yeh Hai Chakkad Bakkad Bumbe Bo, which was based on a Marathi story by Shakuntala was released in 2003.

Personal life
Shakuntala was married for a short time to a Russian painter, Youra Sleptzoff. The couple's  daughter, Sai Paranjpye, was born in  1938. Soon after Sai's birth, she divorced Youra, and reared Sai in her own father's household.

Sai Paranjpye is a noted Hindi movie director and screenwriter. She is known for her comedies and children's movies. In 1991, the Government of India awarded her the Padma Bhushan title in recognition of her artistic talents and for her stories.

Filmography
Ganga Maiyya (1955)
Lokshahir Ram Joshi (1947)
Ramshastri (1944)
Jawani Ka Rang (1941)
Paisa (1941)
Stree (1938)
Duniya Na Mane (1937)
Jeevan Jyoti (1937)
Kunku (1937)
Sultana Chand Biwi (1937)
Bahadur Beti (1935)
Kali Waghan (1935)
Typist Girl (1935)
Bhakta Prahlad (1934)
Bhedi Rajkumar (1934)
Partha Kumar (1934)
Sairandhri (1933)

Authorship
Three years in Australia, (English), Poona, 1951
 Sense and nonsense, (English), New Delhi, Orient Longman, 1970.
 Kāhi Āmbat, Kāhi Goad, (Marathi), Pune, Śrīvidyā Prakāshan, 1979.
 Desh-Videshichyā Lok-Kathā, (Marathi)

References

External links
 

1906 births
2000 deaths
Marathi-language writers
Recipients of the Padma Bhushan in social work
Nominated members of the Rajya Sabha
Indian women novelists
Indian film actresses
Actresses in Hindi cinema
Actresses in Marathi cinema
Indian birth control activists
Alumni of Newnham College, Cambridge
Members of the Maharashtra Legislative Council
20th-century Indian actresses
Marathi politicians
Indian women dramatists and playwrights
20th-century Indian dramatists and playwrights
20th-century Indian novelists
Women writers from Maharashtra
Social workers
20th-century Indian women writers
20th-century Indian educators
Educators from Maharashtra
Dramatists and playwrights from Maharashtra
Novelists from Maharashtra
Women educators from Maharashtra
Social workers from Maharashtra
20th-century women educators
Women members of the Rajya Sabha